Barbon Beck is a small river in Cumbria.  It is a tributary of the River Lune.

Rising at Weather Ling Hill, where it is known as Barkin Beck, the stream passes southwest down Barbondale to Fell House, where, joined by Aygill (itself fed by Hazel Sike, which, like Aygill, rises on Barbon High Fell) and now known as Barbon Beck, it takes a westerly course, past Barbon Manor and through the village of Barbon and under the A683 road. At High Beckfoot it passes under a Grade-II-listed packhorse bridge, before meeting the River Lune opposite Mansergh Hall.

Historically, the source and upper reaches of Barbon Beck were in the West Riding of Yorkshire.

References

Rivers of Cumbria
1Barbon